The Community Université Grenoble Alpes is the association of universities and higher education institutions (ComUE) for institutions of higher education and research for Grenoble, Chambéry, Annecy and Valence in the Rhône-Alpes region of France.

The association was created as a ComUE according to the 2013 Law on Higher Education and Research (France), effective December 29, 2014. At the same time, the three Grenoble universities announced a plan to officially merge as of 1 January 2016.

Members 
Since January 1, 2016, Community Grenoble Alpes University consists of the following institutions:

 Université Grenoble Alpes
 Grenoble Institute of Technology
 Centre national de la recherche scientifique (CNRS)
 French Institute for Research in Computer Science and Automation (INRIA)

Associates 
 University of Savoy
 Grenoble Institute of Political Studies
 École nationale supérieure d'architecture de Grenoble
 Commissariat à l'énergie atomique et aux énergies alternatives
 Grenoble School of Management

References

External links 
 Communauté Université Grenoble Alpes website

Universities in France
Grenoble Alpes University